Bois-d'Amont is a commune in the Jura department in Bourgogne-Franche-Comté in eastern France.

Population

See also
Communes of the Jura department

References

Communes of Jura (department)